Léon Gillaux (23 December 1919 – 5 January 2006) was a Belgian footballer. He played in two matches for the Belgium national football team in 1945.

References

External links
 

1919 births
2006 deaths
Belgian footballers
Belgium international footballers
Association football forwards
Footballers from Namur (province)
People from Philippeville